Buddy Mincey Jr. is an American politician serving as a member of the Louisiana House of Representatives for the 71st district. He assumed office on January 13, 2020.

Early life and education 
Born in Denham Springs, Louisiana, Mincey graduated from Denham Springs High School in 1987. He earned a Bachelor of Science degree in industrial technology from Southeastern Louisiana University in 1993.

Career 
Outside of politics, Mincey worked as a project manager at ELOS Environmental. He was elected to the Livingston Parish School Board in 2006. Mincey was elected to the Louisiana House of Representatives in November 2019 and assumed office on January 13, 2020.

References 

Living people
People from Denham Springs, Louisiana
Southeastern Louisiana University alumni
Louisiana Republicans
Members of the Louisiana House of Representatives
Louisiana Democrats
People from Livingston Parish, Louisiana
Year of birth missing (living people)